Gidget Gets Married is a 1972 American made-for television comedy film produced by Screen Gems for ABC.  It was written by John McGreevey, directed by E.W. Swackhamer and starred Monie Ellis as Gidget.

Plot
Now that Jeff has completed his military service and landed a lucrative job as an engineer, he and Gidget marry and move to Woodlake, Florida, where his new job is.  Gidget finds that Jeff's company exerts far too much control over their lives, deciding where they will live and even choosing their friends for them.  Gidget's rebellion against this lands Jeff in hot water, and their marriage is sorely tested.

Cast

 Michael Burns as Jeff Stevens 
 Monie Ellis as Gidget Stevens
 Don Ameche as Otis Ramsey
 Joan Bennett as Claire Ramsey
 Corinne Camacho as Nancy Lewis 
 Macdonald Carey as Russ Lawrence
 Elinor Donahue as Medley Blaine
 Paul Lynde as Louis B. Latimer
 Roger Perry as Tom Blaine
 Gene Andrusco as Vince Blaine
 Radames Pera as Bob Ramsey
 Tiger Williams as Richie Coleman 
 Dennis Fimple as Policeman
 Ivor Barry as Maitre 'D
 Burke Byrnes as Minister
 Larry Gelman as Anatole
 Helen Funai as Minnie Chan 
 Joseph Bernard as Furniture Man
 Victoria Paige Meyerink as Janie (as Victoria Meyerink)
 Jimmy Bracken as Andy
 Michael Barbera as Chris
 Susan Spell as Little Girl 
 Nicolas Beauvy as Gregg
 James Sikking as Jim Johnson
 Virginia Hawkins as Mrs. Johnson
 William Gray Espy as Chuck 
 Judith McConnell as Ann (as Judy McConnell)
 Larry Delaney as John

See also
 Gidget (film)
 Gidget Goes Hawaiian
 Gidget Goes to Rome
 Gidget (TV series)
 Gidget Grows Up
 Gidget's Summer Reunion
 List of television films produced for American Broadcasting Company

External links
 
 
 
 Two video clips, both trailers for Gidget Gets Married

ABC Movie of the Week
1972 television films
1972 films
Gidget films
Films set in Maryland
Television sequel films
Films directed by E. W. Swackhamer